Giebel may refer to:

Places
 Giebel (mountain) (1,949 m), a mountain in Bavaria, Germany

People with the surname

 Agnes Giebel (1921–2017), a Dutch-born German soprano
 Christoph Gottfried Andreas Giebel (1820–1881), a German zoologist
 Josef Giebel, German volleyball player